TheatreWorks Silicon Valley is a Tony Award-winning non-profit, professional theatre company based in Palo Alto, California, founded in July, 1970. The company is a member of the League of Resident Theatres (LORT) and employs some 300 artists annually, including Equity and non-Equity actors, directors, designers and specialty artists. The company stages a year-round season of eight productions - comedies, dramas, and musicals - in the Mountain View Center for the Performing Arts and in the California Mission-style Lucie Stern Theatre complex in Palo Alto.

History

Beginnings - 1970s
TheatreWorks Silicon Valley began as the dream of Robert Kelley, a Bay Area native who earned his degree in creative writing from Stanford University in 1968. After teaching at Andover Prep in Massachusetts for a year, Kelley returned to Palo Alto, California in 1970. As a musician and occasional actor, Kelley decided he wanted to make his living doing theatre. He got his chance when the city of Palo Alto then asked him to launch a theatre program that would engage teenagers and reflect the concerns of the community. The result was a powerful and original new musical called, Popcorn, which premiered in July 1970. Popcorn spoke volumes to the local community and reflected the tumultuous changes of the late 1960s and early 1970s.

Popcorn became the launching point for a Golden Era of Creativity for the company. In the first 3 years, 13 new productions were written and performed. The small company performed anywhere they could find space - basements, parks, and even old warehouses. But Robert Kelley and TheatreWorks had gained a reputation for putting no limits on creativity. During this time TheatreWorks became known for two distinct qualities—outstanding production values and diversity on stage. Despite a small budget, the influx of talented artists from around the Bay Area allowed TheatreWorks to create extraordinary sets and costumes. The company also regularly featured performers of color on the stage at a time when it was a rare occurrence. By the end of the decade the company had grown to include a six-member Board of Directors, four full-time staff, 700 season subscribers and a budget of nearly $150,000 per season.

1980s
In the 1980s, the company focused on diversity and innovation. Newly hired Associate Artistic Director Anthony J. Haney led the charge to increase awareness of TheatreWorks among top caliber performers of color in the Bay Area and to gain credibility in the African-American, Asian, and Latino communities. In 1981, a world premiere musical, The Fireworks Rag, written by Kelley, was the company's first primarily African-American cast. Furthermore, the company continued to introduce Silicon Valley audiences to plays and musicals never before seen on Bay Area stages. The company shifted its focus from writing new material every few years to finding and illuminating the works of emerging authors from around the country. The Stage II Series was implemented where smaller productions by lesser known authors could be explored and produced.
In 1985, Randy Adams was hired as the company's first managing director and within three years, TheatreWorks had signed its first contracts with the actor's union, Actors' Equity Association, and reached the $1 million mark for its annual budget. By the end of the decade TheatreWorks had a 16-member Board of Directors, 11 full-time staff, 5500 subscribers and a budget of $1.7 million.

1990s
In the 1990s, the company took up residence in the newly built Mountain View Center for the Performing Arts for 5 performances each season, while still keeping 3 performances in their original home, the Lucie Stern Theatre in Palo Alto. They built a fully functional black box stage in Cubberley Center in Palo Alto, to accommodate the Stage II series. The company encountered new opportunities to produce world premieres with established artists. In the early 1990s, the company presented the world premiere of Josephine, a musical based on the life of Josephine Baker, starring Della Reese. They also mounted a national casting search seeking an all-Native American cast for a new musical called Honor Song for Crazy Horse. TheatreWorks continued to top itself in audience attendance and critical acclaim, until the end of the decade when the company had a 20-member Board, 30 full-time staff members, 8500 subscribers, and a $4.5 million budget.

2000s
In the new millennium, TheatreWorks put in renewed energies toward developing New Works. Most notable was the launching of the New Works Initiative, which strives to support the creation of new work by providing writers with the resources to explore their ideas. In 2005 TheatreWorks became a member of the League of Resident Theatres (LORT). Joining the company in 2006, with years of award-winning experience in regional theatre management and development, Managing Director Phil Santora has helped grow the New Works Initiative in both size and stature, while forging relationships between TheatreWorks and other regional theatres. The company continued to produce world premieres, and in fall 2007 they staged their 50th world premiere, Emma, a musical version of the popular Jane Austen novel. The musical would go on to be TheatreWorks' top-grossing, most-attended production at that time.
The Broadway musical Memphis began at TheatreWorks' New Works Festival in 2002 and made its World Premiere as a TheatreWorks Mainstage production in 2004. In 2009, Memphis opened on Broadway and subsequently won four Tony Awards, including Best Musical. During this time period, TheatreWorks also developed a relationship with power-pop musical group GrooveLily. TheatreWorks has produced several of the group's musicals, including Striking 12 and the World Premieres of Long Story Short and Wheelhouse (Mainstage 2012).

2010s
As TheatreWorks concludes its 50th season, it is one of California's largest theatres. A pioneer in diversity programming, a regular home to world and regional premieres, and a widely hailed source of original new works for the American stage, TheatreWorks is the nationally acclaimed theatre of Silicon Valley. In 2017, TheatreWorks presented the world premiere of The Prince of Egypt, a stage musical adaptation based on the hit 1998 DreamWorks Animation film of the same name, with music and lyrics by Stephen Schwartz and a book by Philip LaZebnik. TheatreWorks received the 2019 Regional Theatre Tony Award during the 73rd Tony Awards on June 9, 2019. In June 2020, Founding Artistic Director Robert Kelley retired from the helm of TheatreWorks, ending one of the longest tenures in American Theatre. He was succeeded by Tim Bond, who currently serves as the company's Artistic Director.

Complete repertoire

See List of TheatreWorks (Silicon Valley) productions

New Works Festival
Attracting authors and composers of national stature (including Stephen Schwartz, Paul Gordon, Rajiv Joseph, Marsha Norman, Henry Krieger, Duncan Sheik, Joe DiPietro, Beth Henley, and Andrew Lippa, among many others). TheatreWorks’ annual New Works Festival takes place during the summer. Featuring new plays and musicals in their early stages of development, for two weeks in August audiences watch the works at the Lucie Stern Theatre. The festival has launched new works onto TheatreWorks’ stage and on to productions nationally. Memphis, Fly By Night and Emma were worked on at the festival, as were Striking 12, Equivocation, winner of the 2009 Steinberg/ATCA New Play Award, and The North Pool.

See List of TheatreWorks (Silicon Valley) New Works

See also
American Conservatory Theater, San Francisco, California
Marin Theatre Company, Mill Valley, California
San Jose Repertory Theatre, San Jose, California
Berkeley Repertory Theatre, Berkeley, California
List of LORT Member Theatres

Notes

References

External links
 TheatreWorks.org official website
 Mountain View Center for the Performing Arts official website
 Lucie Stern Community Center official website

1970 establishments in California
League of Resident Theatres
Palo Alto, California
Mountain View, California
Theatre companies in California
Menlo Park, California
Culture in the San Francisco Bay Area
Performing groups established in 1970